Spring Creek is a small town in Marlborough, New Zealand. State Highway 1 runs past the settlement to the west, and the Wairau River flows past to the east. Picton is 22 km to the north, and Blenheim is 6 km to the south.

The first European settlers were George Dodson, William Soper, and Dr Vickerman, in 1850. There was a major flood in 1926, when the Wairau River burst its embankments.

Wairau Marae is located in Spring Creek. It is the marae (meeting ground) of Ngāti Rārua and Ngāti Toa Rangatira, and includes the Wairau wharenui (meeting house).

Spring Creek has a railway classification yard on the Main North Line.

Demographics

Spring Creek had a population of 576 at the 2018 New Zealand census, an increase of 33 people (6.1%) since the 2013 census, and an increase of 3 people (0.5%) since the 2006 census. There were 204 households. There were 315 males and 258 females, giving a sex ratio of 1.22 males per female, with 108 people (18.8%) aged under 15 years, 84 (14.6%) aged 15 to 29, 300 (52.1%) aged 30 to 64, and 93 (16.1%) aged 65 or older.

Ethnicities were 87.5% European/Pākehā, 19.8% Māori, 0.5% Pacific peoples, 3.1% Asian, and 3.1% other ethnicities (totals add to more than 100% since people could identify with multiple ethnicities).

Although some people objected to giving their religion, 61.5% had no religion, 27.6% were Christian, 0.5% were Hindu, 1.0% were Buddhist and 2.1% had other religions.

Of those at least 15 years old, 45 (9.6%) people had a bachelor or higher degree, and 150 (32.1%) people had no formal qualifications. The employment status of those at least 15 was that 267 (57.1%) people were employed full-time, 81 (17.3%) were part-time, and 9 (1.9%) were unemployed.

Spring Creek-Grovetown statistical area
Spring Creek-Grovetown statistical area also includes Grovetown.

Spring Creek-Grovetown had a population of 1,071 at the 2018 New Zealand census, an increase of 99 people (10.2%) since the 2013 census, and an increase of 81 people (8.2%) since the 2006 census. There were 381 households. There were 576 males and 492 females, giving a sex ratio of 1.17 males per female. The median age was 44.2 years (compared with 37.4 years nationally), with 198 people (18.5%) aged under 15 years, 144 (13.4%) aged 15 to 29, 552 (51.5%) aged 30 to 64, and 177 (16.5%) aged 65 or older.

Ethnicities were 89.6% European/Pākehā, 16.5% Māori, 0.6% Pacific peoples, 3.1% Asian, and 2.2% other ethnicities (totals add to more than 100% since people could identify with multiple ethnicities).

The proportion of people born overseas was 11.2%, compared with 27.1% nationally.

Although some people objected to giving their religion, 59.9% had no religion, 29.4% were Christian, 0.3% were Hindu, 0.8% were Buddhist and 3.1% had other religions.

Of those at least 15 years old, 105 (12.0%) people had a bachelor or higher degree, and 237 (27.1%) people had no formal qualifications. The median income was $34,500, compared with $31,800 nationally. The employment status of those at least 15 was that 492 (56.4%) people were employed full-time, 141 (16.2%) were part-time, and 21 (2.4%) were unemployed.

Education
Spring Creek School is a coeducational contributing primary (years 1–6) school with a roll of  A school was first founded in Spring Creek in 1861 or 1863. The present school was founded in 1873.

See also
Moutere Rugby Football Club

Notes

References

Populated places in the Marlborough Region